Sir George Malcolm Hilbery (14 July 1883 – 18 September 1965) was a British judge.

The son of a City solicitor, Hilbery was educated at University College School, and was called to the bar by Gray's Inn in 1907. In 1927 he was elected a bencher of his Inn and appointed Recorder of Margate. He took silk in 1928. In 1935, he was appointed to the High Court and assigned to the King's Bench Division, receiving the customary knighthood the same year. In 1959 he was made a Privy Councillor.

One of the most famous cases he presided over was the Murder of Gay Gibson. On 30 October 1952, he gave Christopher Craig's older brother, Niven, 12 years imprisonment for carrying out an armed robbery. Three days later, Christopher Craig shot dead PC Sidney Miles on a Croydon rooftop. 

Hilbery wrote Duty and Art in Advocacy, which was first published in 1946. For many years a copy of this little book was presented to every Barrister on their being called to the Bar by The Honourable Society of Gray's Inn.

References 

1883 births
1965 deaths
Queen's Bench Division judges
English King's Counsel
Members of Gray's Inn
People educated at University College School
Members of the Privy Council of the United Kingdom
Knights Bachelor
Royal Naval Volunteer Reserve personnel of World War I